The Flood is the first novel by crime writer Ian Rankin.

Plot summary 

Mary Miller has always been an outcast.  As a child, she fell into the hot burn - a torrent of warm chemical run-off from the local coal mine - and her hair turned white.  Initially she was treated with sympathy, but all that changed a few days later, when the young man who pushed her in died in an accident.

Now many years later, Mary is a single mother caught up in a faltering affair.  Her son, Sandy, has fallen in love with a strange homeless girl - and both mother and son are forced to come to terms with a dark secret from Mary's past.

1986 British novels
Novels by Ian Rankin
1986 debut novels
Polygon Books books